Asemabad (also Romanized as Āşemābād, Asemābād, and Āsemābād) is a village in Khosrow Beyk Rural District, Milajerd District, Komijan County, Markazi Province, Iran. At the 2006 census, its population was 9, in 7 families.

References 

Populated places in Komijan County